Shack Mountain is a house near Charlottesville, Virginia, that is a tribute to Thomas Jefferson's architectural style.  It was designed by and for Fiske Kimball (1881-1955), an architectural historian who was the founder of the University of Virginia School of Architecture, and who is credited with restoring respect for Jefferson's architectural ability. The house derives its name from the Shackelford family, who owned and settled the property in the 18th century.

History
Intended as a retirement home for Kimball, the house is based on Jefferson's design for Farmington. The house was built in 1935–36. Like Jefferson at Monticello, Kimball found a site with a commanding view of the wooded hills around Charlottesville. Kimball's intended name for the house was Tusculum, but the name "Shack Mountain," for earlier owners of the property, remained. Kimball and his wife Marie used the house as a retreat, mainly at Christmas and for two weeks in June, until they both died in 1955. They willed the house to the Philadelphia Museum of Art, where Kimball had been director. The museum sold the house to W. Bedford Moore III, a professor of engineering at the University of Virginia.

Description
The one-story, T-shaped house features a projecting octagonal space to either side at the front. Fronting the elongated side of the octagon is a Tuscan portico with paired stucco columns. Windows are mostly triple-hung sashes. The roof is a shallow standing-seam metal hipped structure that defers to the portico.  Exterior balustrades are in the Chinese Chippendale pattern. Entry is through the portico, with the front door leading into a shallow round vestibule projecting into the half-octagonal parlor to the left side with a curved door, an adaptation of Pavilion IX at the University of Virginia. A corresponding alcove leads to the cross corridor, while another door leads to the dining room which occupies the right side of the front octagonal volume. A wing to the rear contains kitchens and bedrooms, none of which are of unusual design. A basement houses utility spaces.

Shack Mountain was placed on the National Register of Historic Places on September 1, 1976, and was declared a National Historic Landmark on October 5, 1992, for its association with Kimball. 

See also
List of National Historic Landmarks in Virginia
National Register of Historic Places listings in Albemarle County, Virginia

References

External links
Shack Mountain, Albemarle County, two photos at Virginia DHR
National Register of Historic Places, Nomination Form', United States Department of the Interior, National Park Service (pdf)
 Shack Mountain, part of Fiske exhibit at the University of Virginia
'Curve Appeal', David Maurer, The Daily Progress, Charlottesville, Virginia, 9 January 2011

National Historic Landmarks in Virginia
Houses on the National Register of Historic Places in Virginia
Houses in Albemarle County, Virginia
Houses completed in 1935
Palladian Revival architecture in Virginia
National Register of Historic Places in Albemarle County, Virginia